Perto do Amanhecer is the second studio album by Brazilian progressive rock group Apocalypse. The compositions are in the symphonic prog rock way with influences of progressive British bands such as Yes, Marillion, IQ, Genesis and Emerson, Lake & Palmer. Keyboardist Eloy Fritsch's Minimoog solos and synthesizers are present on all tracks of this CD. The album has some classical moments and even hard rock passages. The lyrics are in Portuguese and deal with several themes, such as existentialism, nature, science fiction, and mysticism. Musea invited the band to perform at a compilation, which came later as Le Melleur du Progressif Instrumental. This CD was edited in the end of 1995 with several European bands and Apocalypse representing Brazil with the song "Notre Dame".

Track listing
 Ao Cair No Espaço 
 Terra Azul 
 Magia 
 Fantasia Mística 
 Notredame 
 Nascente 
 Na Terra Onde as Folhas Caem 
 Lágrimas 
 Corta 
 Paz da Solidão 
 Sob a Luz de Um Olhar

Personnel
 Eloy Fritsch: Synthesizer, Piano, organ, moog
 Ruy Fritsch: Electric and acoustic guitars
 Chico Fasoli: Drums, percussion
 Chico Casara: Lead Vocal, Bass guitar

References

1995 albums
Apocalypse (band) albums